"Harrison Bergeron" is a satirical dystopian science-fiction short story  by American writer  Kurt Vonnegut, first published in October 1961. Originally published in The Magazine of Fantasy and Science Fiction, the story was republished in the author's Welcome to the Monkey House collection in 1968.

Plot
In the year 2081, the 211th, 212th, and 213th amendments to the Constitution dictate that all Americans are fully equal and not allowed to be smarter, better-looking, or more physically able than anyone else. The Handicapper General's agents enforce the equality laws, forcing citizens to wear "handicaps": masks for those who are too beautiful, earpiece radios for the intelligent that broadcast loud noises meant to disrupt thoughts, and heavy weights for the strong or athletic.

One April, 14-year-old Harrison Bergeron, an intelligent, athletic, and good-looking teenager, is taken away from his parents, George and Hazel, by the government. They are barely aware of the tragedy, as Hazel has "average" intelligence (contextually meaning stupidity), and George wears a handicap radio to regulate his intelligence.

George and Hazel watch a televised ballet performance and comment on the dancers, who are weighed down to counteract their gracefulness and masked to hide their attractiveness. George's thoughts are continually interrupted by the different noises emitted by his handicap radio, which piques Hazel's curiosity and imagination regarding handicaps. Noticing his exhaustion, Hazel urges George to lie down and rest his "handicap bag",  of weights locked around his neck. She suggests taking a few of the weights out of the bag, but George resists, aware of the illegality of such an action.

On television, a news reporter struggles to read the bulletin and hands it to the ballerina wearing the most grotesque mask and heaviest weights. She begins reading in her unacceptably natural, beautiful voice, then apologizes before switching to a more unpleasant one.

George recognizes his son for a moment, before having the thought eliminated by his radio. Harrison himself then storms the television studio in an attempt to overthrow the government. He declares himself Emperor and rips off both his own handicaps and those of a ballerina, whom he chooses as his Empress. He orders the musicians to play, promising them nobility if they do their best. Unhappy with their initial attempt, Harrison takes control for a short while, and the music improves. After listening and being moved by the music, Harrison and his Empress dance while flying to the ceiling, then pause in mid-air to kiss.

Diana Moon Glampers, the Handicapper General, enters the studio and kills Harrison and the Empress with two shotgun blasts. She threatens the musicians at gunpoint to put on their handicaps again, but the television goes dark. George, unaware of the televised incident, returns from the kitchen and asks Hazel why she was crying, to which she replies that something sad happened on television that she cannot remember. He comforts her and they return to their average lives.

Characters
He wants to live as an unimpeded human being and does not want to obey the laws of the government, which has taken on the responsibility of creating equality for the whole American society. He has been jailed by the Handicapper General's office for planning to overthrow the government. To eliminate any "unfair advantages", the Handicapper General forces him to wear the most extreme handicaps reflecting his extraordinary attributes: huge earphones and spectacles intended to make him half blind and give him tremendous headaches, disfiguring makeup in the form of blackened teeth and a red rubber nose to mask his extraordinary looks, and so many weights to compensate his prodigious strength that they make him look more like a junk yard than a man. When he escapes from jail, the government describes him as "a genius and an athlete" and tells people that he should be regarded as extremely dangerous. When Harrison enters the television studio, he is convinced that he can overthrow the government and declares "I am the Emperor! ... Do you hear? I am the Emperor! Everybody must do what I say at once!" In addition to this talent and egotism, he also possesses artistic and romantic characteristics. He sings and dances with his Empress, defying gravity while doing so. Despite Harrison's superior physical prowess and intellectual faculties, he is stopped when the Handicapper General, Diana Moon Glampers, shoots him and his Empress down with a shotgun.
George Bergeron is Harrison's father and Hazel's husband. A very smart and sensitive character, he is handicapped artificially by the government. Like his son, he has to wear mental handicap earphones in his ears to keep him from thinking intensely and analytically. Because he is stronger than average, he has to wear weights around his neck. When his wife Hazel suggests that he could take these weights off for a while to relax, he rejects the idea. He wants to obey the laws and is unwilling to risk punishment for a little comfort. He believes that the situation in 2081 is better than it had been back in the days when fierce competition reigned in society. He has much respect for the rules and represents the common passive citizen who does not critique a government that manipulates individuals. Obeying the rules, he is even incapable of recognizing the tragic situation when his son has been shot to death – a harsh critique of passiveness towards authority.
Hazel Bergeron is Harrison's mother and George's wife. Hazel has what is described as perfectly average intelligence, which means that she cannot think deeply about anything. However, she is a well-intentioned character, a loving wife and mother, who tries to comfort her husband by suggesting he removes his handicap weights. She cries when she sees what happens to her son but due to her impaired faculties quickly forgets the subject of her sorrow. In the end all her kindness counts for nothing as her stupidity outruns her good intentions. Hazel bears a resemblance to the Handicapper General, Diana Moon Glampers.
The Ballerina, a beautiful dancer who was burdened with an especially ugly mask and excessive weights ("as big as those worn by two-hundred-pound men"), as she is the fairest, most beautiful and most graceful of the dancers. She reads an announcement card after the stammering announcer is unable to. It is likely, but not stated, that she is the same dancer who Harrison Bergeron takes as his Empress, who is later shot by Diana Moon Glampers for not wearing her handicaps, and dancing with Harrison Bergeron.
Diana Moon Glampers, despite appearing in person for only four sentences, represents the oppressive government and enforces its handicapping policies. It is mentioned early on that Hazel resembles Diana, and Hazel mentions improvements she would make to Diana's handicap regulations. She appears ruthless when she kills Harrison and his Empress without warning, and threatens the musicians with a similar fate before the broadcast is interrupted, leaving their future ambiguous. Diana's first and middle names are possibly a reference to Diana, the Roman huntress, virgin goddess of the moon. Vonnegut re-used the name for a character in God Bless You, Mr. Rosewater.

Style

In this story, Vonnegut's writing style is influenced by his early work as a journalist. His sentences are short and easily understood so as to be largely accessible. A dystopian setting enhances his social and political critique by imagining a future world founded on absolute equality through handicaps assigned to various above-average people to counter their natural advantages. A similar subject can be found in L. P. Hartley's dystopian novel Facial Justice from the previous year of 1960.

Vonnegut also punctuates his dystopia with humor. Even the most horrifying scenes are underlined by jokes or absurdity. When the news announcer is supposed to read a news bulletin he has to hand it to a nearby ballerina because of his speech impediment, and the ballerina then alters her voice to a "grackle squawk" because it would be "unfair" to use her natural voice, described as a "warm, luminous, timeless melody". This absurdity highlights the madness of the world of "Harrison Bergeron".

Parallels with The Sirens of Titan
A dystopian society similar to that of "Harrison Bergeron" appears in Vonnegut's 1959 novel The Sirens of Titan. When the Space Wanderer returns to Earth he finds a society in which handicaps are used to make all people equal, eradicating the supposedly ruinous effects of blind luck on human society. The narrator claims that now "the weakest and the meekest were bound to admit, at last, that the race of life was fair".

The strong are burdened with "handicaps" (consisting of "bags of lead shot" hung from various parts of the body) and the beautiful hide their advantageous appearance through "frumpish clothes, bad posture, chewing gum and a ghoulish use of cosmetics". Unlike in "Harrison Bergeron", however, the citizens in The Sirens of Titan choose to wear these handicaps voluntarily as an act of faith towards the Church of God the Utterly Indifferent, although it is suggested that not to do so would invite social condemnation. There are no handicaps for above-average intelligence mentioned in The Sirens of Titan. The society of "Harrison Bergeron" addresses differences in intellectual and cognitive ability and their entailing advantages.

Adaptations 
The story has been adapted for the screen at least four times.

PBS adapted several stories, including "Harrison Bergeron", in Between Time and Timbuktu (1972), with Avind Haerum in the title role.
In 1995, Showtime produced a full-length made-for-television adaptation entitled Harrison Bergeron, starring Sean Astin as the title character and Christopher Plummer as John Klaxon. The adaptation diverged from the plot considerably, featuring Harrison being recruited by the National Administration Center, a secret cabal of geniuses within the government who ensure that the handicapped America functions. Working for the television division, Harrison becomes dissatisfied with the status quo and attempts to start another American revolution by taking over the nation's television broadcasting. He broadcasts old unhandicapped movies and music, while encouraging people to remove the brain-handicapping "bands" on their heads.
In 2006, a short film also entitled Harrison Bergeron was released.
In 2009, another short film called 2081 was based on the original story and starred Armie Hammer as Harrison Bergeron. Joe Crowe, managing editor of the online magazine Revolution Science Fiction, described the movie as "stirring and dramatic" and said it "gets right to the point, and nails the adaptation in about 25 minutes."

Cultural references 
In 2005, the story was quoted by attorneys in a brief before the Kansas Supreme Court. Vonnegut was quoted as saying that while he did not mind the story being used in the suit, he disagreed with the lawyers' interpretation of it. U.S. Supreme Court Justice Antonin Scalia quoted the story in PGA Tour, Inc. v. Martin. A 2013 academic paper criticizing the new hyperandrogenism policies of the International Association of Athletics Federations and the International Olympic Committee was entitled "The Harrison Bergeron Olympics" and several non-academics had similar criticisms.

See also 
 Crab mentality
 Dumbing down
 Law of Jante
 Procrustes
 Tall poppy syndrome
 The Starlit Corridor

References

Further reading
 Klinkowitz, Jerome (1998): Vonnegut in Fact. The public spokesman of personal fiction. Columbia: University of South Carolina Press
 Leeds, Marc (1995): The Vonnegut Encyclopedia. An Authorized Compendium. Westport, London: Greenwood Press
 Leeds, Marc; Reed, Peter J. (1996): The Vonnegut Chronicles. Interviews and Essays. Westport, London: Greenwood Press
 Petterson, Bo (1994): The World according to Kurt Vonnegut. Moral Paradox and Narrative Form. Åbo: Åbo University.

External links 

 Full text of Harrison Bergeron at The Internet Archive
 
 

 Kurt Vonnegut, Harrison Bergeron, and an Introduction to Deviance and Social Control A teaching-related essay by Kenneth Mentor
 
 Vonnegut's "Harrison Bergeron" wins Hall of Fame.

1961 short stories
Bergeron, Harrison
Dystopian literature
Egalitarianism
Fiction set in 2081
Satirical works
Science fiction short stories
Short stories adapted into films
Short stories by Kurt Vonnegut
Short stories set in the United States
Social engineering (political science)
Works originally published in The Magazine of Fantasy & Science Fiction